Nanqiao District is a district of the prefecture-level city of Chuzhou in Anhui Province, China.

Administrative divisions
Nanqiao District has 1 subdistrict and 8 towns.
1 Subdistrict
Dawang Subdistrict

8 Towns

References

Chuzhou